Phil Booth (born December 31, 1995) is an American professional basketball player for Petkim Spor of the Basketbol Süper Ligi (BSL). He played college basketball for the Villanova Wildcats.

High school career
Booth played high school basketball at Mount Saint Joseph in Baltimore. While there, Booth was selected as the 2013–14 Baltimore Prep Player of the Year. He was also a first team All-Catholic league selection. Phil holds the record for most points at Mount Saint Joseph High School.

College career
Booth entered Villanova as a freshman during the 2014–15 season. He immediately contributed to team, and at the end of the seasons was named the Philadelphia Big Five rookie of the year.

During his sophomore year, Booth continued to contribute during the 2015–16 season in important situations. He scored a team high 20 points in the National Championship game victory over North Carolina. He hit two free throws with 35 seconds left in the game. Booth averaged 7.0 points per game that season.

In his junior year, he was limited to three games and was forced to redshirt due to lingering knee pain.

Booth suffered further injury as a redshirt junior, as he fractured his right hand in a game against Providence on January 23, 2018. He returned on February 21 in a 93–62 win over DePaul and scored 14 points off the bench. After the injury Booth acknowledged that his offensive rhythm was disrupted by the injury so he shot less but remained a starter. In his redshirt junior season Booth won the championship with Villanova for the second time in his career.

As a senior, Booth averaged 18.6 points, 3.9 rebounds, and 3.8 assists per game. He finished his career as the ninth player in Villanova history with 1,500 points and 300 assists, and he played in a school-record 148 games.

Professional career
After going undrafted in the 2019 NBA draft, Booth joined the Cleveland Cavaliers for the 2019 NBA Summer League. On July 26, 2019, Booth signed an Exhibit 10 contract with the Washington Wizards, but was waived by the Wizards on October 16.

Capital City Go-Go (2019–2020)
On October 27, 2019, Booth was included in roster of the Capital City Go-Go. On January 4, 2020, he scored 22 points and had four rebounds in a loss to the Fort Wayne Mad Ants.

Oklahoma City Blue (2021)
On February 16, 2021, the Oklahoma City Blue announced that they had acquired Booth. In six games, he averaged 8.7 points, 2.3 rebounds, and 2.2 assists per game.

Filou Oostende (2021–2022)
On June 16, 2021, Booth signed with Oostende of the Belgian BNXT League. Oostende also plays in the Basketball Champions League.

Budućnost VOLI (2022) 
On July 14, 2022, Booth signed with Budućnost VOLI of the Montenegrin First League, the ABA League and the EuroCup.

Petkim Spor (2022–present) 
On December 31, 2022, he signed with Petkim Spor of the Basketbol Süper Ligi (BSL).

Personal life
Booth's father, Phil Booth Sr., played college basketball at Coppin State from 1987 to 1990.

References

1995 births
Living people
21st-century African-American sportspeople
African-American basketball players
American expatriate basketball people in Belgium
American men's basketball players
Basketball players from Baltimore
BC Oostende players
Capital City Go-Go players
Oklahoma City Blue players
Petkim Spor players
Point guards
Shooting guards
Villanova Wildcats men's basketball players